is a Japanese scholar in the fields of management science and industrial psychology and founder of SANNO Institute of Management. He has been called the "father of Japanese administrative science".

A graduate of the Philosophy Faculty of Tokyo Imperial University, with a specialization in psychology, Mr. Ueno shifted his research focus to issues in business administration and management, and became a specialist in scientific management. 

His son Ichiro Ueno pioneered Japanese quality assurance.

Experience
Japanese SANNO INSTITUTE was founded in 1925 by Yoichi Ueno.

In 1942 Yoichi Ueno founded SANNO UNIVERSITY.

In 1950, SANNO UNIVERSITY was reformed positively, and Jiyugaoka Sanno College was founded at the same time.

References
Wood, John C. and Michael C. F.W. Taylor: Critical Evaluations in Business and Management, Routledge, 2002.  
Chapter "On Japanese Management Philosophy: Scientific Management in Japan" - Pages 375-385

History of SANNO(External Link)

External links
 Yoichi Ueno

Japanese business theorists
1883 births
1957 deaths
University of Tokyo alumni